Jane Barnell  (January 3, 1879 – July 21, 1945) was an American bearded lady who worked in circus sideshows, dime museums and carnivals, who used various stage names including Princess Olga, Madame Olga and  Lady Olga. In her only film role in Tod Browning's cult classic Freaks, using the sideshow stage name Olga Roderick, she was billed as the "Bearded Lady".

Biography 
Jane Barnell was born in Wilmington, North Carolina, to George Barnell, a Russian Jewish itinerant wagon maker, and his wife, a woman of Irish and Catawban ancestry.  When she applied for her social security card in May 1939, she gave her parents as George Barnell and Nancy Shaw. Her mother's name is not mentioned in the interviews she gave. She was their second child, and she had three sisters and two brothers. She was named after her maternal grandmother. Her mother was from York County, South Carolina. By two years of age, she was capable of growing a beard. Her mother thought she was cursed and took her to hoodoo doctors and other folk healers to remove her condition.

Barnell's mother sold the 4-year-old Jane to the Great Orient Family Circus and Menagerie while her father was away on business in Baltimore. The circus consisted of the Muslim woman who worked as manager, two of her daughters who danced, and three sons who juggled and were tight rope walkers. Jane toured with the circus for several months around the South before the circus went to New Orleans, left for Europe, and took her with them. In Europe, the circus toured with a German circus. She fell ill with typhoid fever in Berlin. She was placed in a charity hospital and later in an orphanage. She was later found by her father by the time she was five. He had either tracked the circus from the Carolinas to Germany, or the woman who ran the circus had the Berlin police contact the sheriff of Wilmington.

After that incident, Barnell was placed in the care of her Catawban grandmother who lived in Mecklenburg County, North Carolina. She began to shave in order to conceal her condition.  Her grandmother told her stories about Florence Nightingale, which inspired her to work as a student nurse in the old city hospital at Wilmington when she turned 17. She worked there for about a year until an unpleasant incident occurred that made her believe she would never have a normal life. She returned to her grandmother's farm. In spring 1892, she met a circus performer, Professor William Heckler, who talked her into stopping shaving and got her employment with John Robinson's Circus. She tried several stage names before eventually settling on Lady Olga Roderick. At that time, her beard was 13 inches long. She went back to North Carolina every winter until her grandmother died in 1899. She worked with the Robinson circus for fourteen years.

At some point during her life, Barnell worked as a trapeze artist before having a railroad accident that ended her career. She then became a commercial photographer.

Barnell toured for a time with a number of circuses, including the Ringling Brothers circus, and later joined Hubert's Museum in Times Square, New York City. She appeared in a Tod Browning's Freaks (1932) which, according to the DVD documentary, left her unhappy with the overall portrayal of the sideshow performers in the film.

In April 1935, she was working at the Ringling Brothers' sideshow at Madison Square Garden.

In 1940, she was interviewed by Joseph Mitchell for an article for The New Yorker. His interview is one of the few sources that exists about her life.

Her date and place of death has been erroneously reported online as October 26, 1951. That date comes from some researchers confusing her death with that of a Susan Jane Barnell. When approached by Diane Arbus about information regarding her death, Joseph Mitchell verified her passing.

Barnell died on July 21, 1945 in Manhattan. Her remains were cremated by the New York and New Jersey Cremation Company.

Personal life 
Barnell was married four times. Her first marriage was to a German musician who played in the band for John Robinson's Circus. She had two children with him. Her husband and their two children died within several years. Her second husband was a balloonist who was killed months after their marriage. Her third marriage was to an alcoholic whom she divorced.  Her last marriage, in 1931, was to her manager Thomas O'Boyle, an orphan ex-circus clown and a sideshow talker for Hubert's Dime Museum. She had little contact with her family after she became a performer. She believed they thought she was a disgrace. By 1940, she claimed to have not seen her siblings in 22 years and believed them to be dead. One of her sisters worked as a nurse helping blind Chinese children.

In April 1935, she gave a slightly different account of her personal life when interviewed by Ruth McKenney. She claimed that she had been married thrice; the first time when she was fourteen; the second time when she was nineteen; and then to her husband of four years Thomas O'Boyle.

References

1879 births
1945 deaths
People from Wilmington, North Carolina
Bearded women
Sideshow performers
American people of Russian-Jewish descent
American people of Irish descent
People from Mecklenburg County, North Carolina
American people of Catawba descent